Zilbachi is a rural locality (a selo) in Dakhadayevsky District, Republic of Dagestan, Russia. The population was 937 as of 2010. There are 6 streets.

Geography
Zilbachi is located 10 km southeast of Urkarakh (the district's administrative centre) by road. Zubanchi and Kudagu are the nearest rural localities.

Nationalities 
Dargins live there.

References 

Rural localities in Dakhadayevsky District